Bioeconomics is closely related to the early development of theories in fisheries economics, initially in the mid-1950s by Canadian economists Scott Gordon (in 1954) and Anthony Scott (1955). Their ideas used recent achievements in biological fisheries modelling, primarily the works by Schaefer in 1954 and 1957 on establishing a formal relationship between fishing activities and biological growth through mathematical modelling confirmed by empirical studies, and also relates itself to ecology and the environment and resource protection.

These ideas developed out of the multidisciplinary fisheries science environment in Canada at the time. Fisheries science and modelling developed rapidly during a productive and innovative period, particularly among Canadian fisheries researchers of various disciplines. Population modelling and fishing mortality were introduced to economists, and new interdisciplinary modelling tools became available for the economists, which made it possible to evaluate biological and economic impacts of different fishing activities and fisheries management decisions.

See also
Green economics
EconMult
Economics of biodiversity
Ecological economics
 List of harvested aquatic animals by weight

Notes

References
 Anderson LG and Seijo JC (2010) Bioeconomics of Fisheries Management John Wiley and Sons. .
 Seijo JC, Defeo O and Salas S (1998) Fisheries bioeconomics: Theory, modelling and management FAO Fisheries, Technical paper 368. .
 
Schaefer, Milner B. (1954), "Some aspects of the dynamics of populations important to the management of commercial marine fisheries", Bulletin of the Inter-American Tropical Tuna Commission (reprinted in Bulletin of Mathematical Biology, Vol. 53, No. 1/2, pp. 253-279, 1991 ed.), 1 (2): 27–56, doi:10.1007/BF02464432

External links
Springer Journal of Bioeconomics
 Fishery Bioeconomics
 From the Wolfram Demonstrations Project — requires CDF player (free):
 The Gordon-Schaefer Model
 Bioeconomics of a Discrete Ricker Model with Delayed Recruitment
 Surplus Production Models and Equilibrium Harvest
 Maximizing the Present Value of Resource Rent in a Gordon-Schaefer Model

Fisheries science
Resource economics
Interdisciplinary subfields of economics